Empire of a Thousand Planets is volume two in the French comic book (or bande dessinée) science fiction series Valérian and Laureline created by writer Pierre Christin and artist Jean-Claude Mézières.

Synopsis

Valérian and Laureline are ordered to Syrte-the-Magnificent, capital of the Empire of a Thousand Planets to investigate whether the empire is a potential threat to Galaxity, the capital of Earth in the 28th century. Exploring the markets, Valérian buys Laureline an old gold watch which she hangs around her neck. Attracted by a gathering, they discover that one of the Authorities, the strange masked soothsayers who it is said are the real power on Syrte, is holding a consultation. Suddenly, in the middle of the session, the Authority notices the watch around Laureline's neck. He asks her what the watch is for. When she replies that it is to tell the time, the crowd erupts in laughter. The Authority departs suddenly leaving a bemused Valérian and Laureline.

Returning to the spaceport, Valérian and Laureline's boat is attacked and they are taken prisoner. They are transported to one of the Authority's temples. An Authority appears before them and asks if they are Terrans. He knows they are from Earth because of the watch – all Syrtiens have an innate biological ability to tell the time and would have no use for such a device. He tells them that the Authority's revenge against Earth will be dreadful. Valérian and Laureline give the guards the slip and exploring the temple are amazed to discover sophisticated machinery and laboratories. Finding a hangar they escape the temple in an aircraft but are pursued. The pursuit breaks off when they enter a cloud and Valérian and Laureline soon find out why as their aircraft is battered by an ice storm. Ditching the aircraft, they begin their journey back to Syrte on foot where they meet a group of fishermen who agree to bring them to the city on their boat.

Reaching Syrte, Valérian and Laureline attempt to gain entry to the Imperial Palace by dressing as nobles but they are refused entry by the guards. Meeting a merchant called Elmir, he offers to get them into the palace in return for them sharing information about what they find inside with him. Elmir organises for them to hide inside a consignment of Schamil clams warning them not to allow the clam to close completely over them or they will be affected by its hallucinogenic properties. Once inside the palace, Valérian emerges safely from his clam but is horrified to discover Laureline's has broken into pieces. Searching for Laureline, Valérian enters the opulent hall where the festival is going on and is amazed to see her sharing a cupola with the emperor, Prince Ramal. The festival ends and as the crowds make their way to the exit, Valérian makes for the wing where the Authorities are housed. He finds the Authorities gathered in a chamber, their masks removed, drinking a strange phosphorescent liquid chanting "So that we may live and the Earth dies!". Suddenly a portcullis closes behind him and he is a prisoner. Taken to the interrogation room, the Authorities use their machines to extract information about Valérian's astroship and about the Earth.

The next morning, the door to the interrogation room opens and Laureline leads Prince Ramal into the room – she has heard about Valérian's capture and has convinced the Prince to agree to release him. The Authorities object but the Prince insists on keeping his promise. Leaving the palace, Valérian and Laureline head into the slums of the city to the address Elmir left them. Arriving at the house, they are amazed to discover that Elmir is, in fact, the Grand Master of the Merchant's Guild. He brings them to a secret meeting of the guild members. After Valérian and Laureline have told their story, Elmir and the other merchants fill them in on the Authorities rise to power – they arrived on Syrte a hundred years ago and used their superior knowledge of medicine and psychology to make their name on Syrte. They used their ever-increasing power to suppress scientific knowledge and replace it with their religion. The resulting impact on trade has prompted the guild to act – they have discovered that the Authorities base of operations is located on a barren asteroid called Slomp. They want Valérian and his astroship to lead a fleet to assault the base.

Valérian agrees and a few days later Elmir manages to escort them safely to the spaceport and their astroship. They take off accompanied by the guild spaceships. The fleet swells its numbers by calling on further guild ships from the other planets in the empire. Approaching Slomp, Elmir reveals why he wanted Valérian and his astroship – he knows Valérian and Laureline are aliens from Earth and also that their astroship is capable of jumping in space-time. He hopes that ability will give them the upper hand. When the Authorities attack the fleet in their spaceships, Valérian executes a series of spatio-temporal jumps and destroys the Authorities' ships.

Arriving at Slomp, the fleet lands and the Guild troops led by Elmir head for the base. The hills on Slomp look like faces and Elmir explains that they are the remains of the indigenous inhabitants of Slomp. Flowing from their eyes like tears is the strange phosphorescent liquid Valérian saw the Authorities drinking in the Imperial Palace on Syrte. The Authorities' base turns out to be a crashed spaceship. Outside, slave laborers are hard at work gathering the phosphorescent tears. Surrounding the base, the troops launch a surprise attack and, aided by the slaves, easily overcome the guards. As they close in on the spaceship, a voice from a loudspeaker requests Valérian to enter the ship alone.

Reaching the flight deck of the spaceship, he is greeted by the Authorities. They remove their helmets to reveal themselves as horribly scarred, ancient humans. They were part of a space expedition that left Earth many centuries ago. An accident during flight caused them to crash on Slomp where they used the phosphorescent liquid to extend their lives beyond the normal human span. Eventually, they captured a Syrtien spaceship and made their way to Syrte to take over. Their plan was to assemble an armada to attack Earth as revenge against the planet for making no effort to rescue them. However, the technology of Valérian's astroship is vastly superior to theirs – he destroyed their entire  squadron – and they have now realised that any attempt at revenge is doomed to fail. Accordingly, they have chosen to commit suicide instead – the spaceship is rigged to explode. Valérian leaves and the spaceship blows up. Elsewhere, throughout the empire, the other Authorities destroy their temples taking their own lives in the process.

Returning to Syrte with the fleet and the freed slaves, Elmir is delighted – the Empire will be back to normal again. He is surprised then when Valérian tells him that, with the Authorities gone, there has been an uprising on Syrte – the fishermen and the peasants have risen up, helped by the scientists and academics who went into hiding during the Authorities' purges. Valérian explains that the reason as to why the Authorities took over so easily was that the empire was already in decline and that the Authorities were the only thing keeping the imperial system going. Sensing an opportunity, Elmir asks Valérian if he could use the spatio-temporal jump to get back to Syrte ahead of his rival merchants so that he can stake a claim in the new provisional government. Valérian agrees and, later, parts company with Elmir outside the Imperial Palace. Valérian and Laureline return to their astroship intending to ask Earth to send a trade mission to Syrte to assist them.

Principal characters
 Valérian, a spatio-temporal agent from Galaxity in the 28th century
 Laureline, originally from France in the 11th century, now a spatio-temporal agent of Galaxity in the 28th century
 Elmir, Grand Master of the Guild of Merchants on Syrte-The-Magnificent
 The Authorities, mysterious masked clerics
 Prince Ramal, Emperor of the Thousand Planets

Settings
 The Syrtien System, Empire of a Thousand Planets, 2730:
 Syrte-The-Magnificent, capital of the Empire. The City of Syrte is dominated by the Imperial Palace, which is off-limits to all but the Ambassadors of the Empire and the favourites of the prince. The city itself is a vast marketplace where merchants trade wares from all corners of the Empire. A network of canals connects the districts of the city with the spaceport and the cultivated areas outlying the city. Beyond them lie dense jungles where peasant fishermen hunt the huge Marcyam water serpents and where the mysterious Authorities have their strange temples. The Syrtien climate has no wind, so boats are driven by paddles powered by solar sails, while static electricity causes dense ice storms to spring up suddenly. When the ice melts, the pollen that is released causes beautiful flowers to bloom in the air. The perfume of the flowers forces the Marcyams out of their waterholes which allow the fishermen to hunt them.
 Glam, a forest world.
 Murmyl, homeworld of the greatest architects of the Syrtien System.
 Mintel, a powerful industrial base.
 Simius, another world of the Syrtien Empire.
 Slomp, a remote, barren asteroid. The rocky hills of the asteroid resemble faces of living beings – these are the ancient inhabitants of Slomp who are slowly being absorbed into the ground. A phosphorous liquid exudes from their eyes like tears. When drunk, this liquid can be used to extend human life beyond its normal span.

Notes
 This is the first Valérian album to move into fully fledged space opera, as opposed to the time travel theme of the previous stories.
 Kim Thompson of The Comics Journal, in his introduction to Valerian: The New Future Trilogy (an English language collection of the albums On the Frontiers, The Living Weapons and The Circles of Power), has pointed out the similarities in the visual look of this album and George Lucas' Star Wars trilogy and states that the film's designers, some of whom were French, owned a collection of Valérian albums. In particular, he points to similarities between the scene where Valérian is interrogated by the Authorities and the scene in The Empire Strikes Back where Han Solo is encased in a substance called carbonite.
 Valérian and Laureline's saucer-shaped astroship makes its first appearance in an album (it was first seen in the short-story The Great Collector) and we learn its designation, XB982, for the first time. The astroship appears in virtually every subsequent album.
 There is a brief reference to the planet Bluxte as being one of the planets of the Empire. Bluxte is referenced again in Ambassador of the Shadows as being the homeworld of the Grumpy Converter, a creature the reappears in several subsequent albums. Bluxte appears to be a planet with a surplus of unusual (and useful) fauna – in the case of Empire of a Thousand Planets, we are introduced briefly to the telepathic Spiglics, familiar animals that live on the head of their master, communicating their continuous happiness to him or her by thought transference.
 The film adaptation of the series of stories is named after this album; "Valerian and the City of a Thousand Planets."

1971 graphic novels
Valérian and Laureline
Fiction set in the 28th century